Narayanapuram or Narayana Puram may refer to:

 Narayanapuram, Khammam district, a village in the state of Telangana, India
 Narayanapuram, Krishna, a village in Bantumilli mandal, Krishna district, Andhra Pradesh, India
 Narayanapuram, Vizianagaram district, a village in the state of Andhra Pradesh, India
 Narayanapuram, Yadadri Bhuvanagiri district, a village in the state of Telangana, India

See also
 Narayanapur (disambiguation)